Tarang Jain (born 1962/1963) is an Indian billionaire businessman, the CEO and 86% owner of Varroc, an Indian two- and four-wheeler parts manufacturer. Jain family net worth $2 billion.

Early life and education
His mother Suman is the sister of Rahul Bajaj. His father is Naresh Chandra Jain, who founded Varroc, and he has an identical twin brother Anurang Jain, who runs another car components company, Endurance Technologies.

Jain earned a bachelor's degree from University of Mumbai, and an MBA from IMD Business School in Lausanne, Switzerland.

Career
Jain founded Varroc in 1990.

In 2012, he bought Visteon's global lighting interests, the world’s sixth largest lighting business, for $90.5 million.

Personal life
Jain is married, with two children, and lives in Aurangabad, India.

References

Living people
1960s births
Indian billionaires
Indian company founders
University of Mumbai alumni
People from Aurangabad, Maharashtra
Bajaj family
International Institute for Management Development alumni